Hong Bao (fl. ca. 1412–1433) was a Chinese eunuch sent on overseas diplomatic missions during the reigns of the Yongle Emperor and Xuande Emperor in the Ming dynasty. He is best known as the commander of one of the detached squadrons of Zheng He's fleet during the Seventh Voyage of this fleet to the Indian Ocean (1431–1433).

Early career
According to the History of Ming, in 1412 (i.e., some time between the third and fourth voyages of Zheng He's fleet), Hong Bao was sent by the Yongle Emperor as the envoy to Thailand.

In 1421 Hong Bao participated in the sixth voyage of Zheng He, during which foreign envoys were transported back to their countries, as far as Ormus.

Hong Bao on the Seventh Voyage of Zheng He
Hong Bao's name appears in the inscription made by Zheng He in Liujiagang in 1431, before his fleet left China on its 7th (and last) voyage to the "Western Ocean" (Indian Ocean). According to the inscription,
the two Principal Envoys (正使) sent by the Xuande Emperor to the countries of the Western Ocean were the eunuchs Zheng He and Wang Jinghong.
Hong Bao was one of the five Assistant Envoys (副使) (along with Zhu Liang, Zhou Man, Yang Zhen, and Zhang Da). Hong Bao, as well as all other Principal and Assistant Envoys except for Zhang Da, had the eunuch rank of Grand Director (太監, Taijian).

Much of what we know about Hong Bao comes from the book written by the interpreter Ma Huan, who served in his squadron during the 7th voyage of Zheng He's fleet. According to Edward L. Dreyer's analysis of the preserved sources about the voyage, in particular Ma Huan's book, Hong Bao commanded a  squadron which most likely separated from the main fleet in Semudera in northern Sumatra (although other suggested it may have happened earlier, in Qui Nhon in Champa), and visited Bengal. From Bengal, Hong Bao's squadron would then go to Calicut in southern India, to which the main fleet came directly from Semudera across the Bay of Bengal.

While the main fleet left Calicut to Ormus (in Persian Gulf), Hong Bao's squadron went from Calicut to various destinations on the west side of the Arabian Sea in southern Arabia and Horn of Africa, including Aden and Mogadishu. Before leaving Calicut, Hong Bao sent seven of his sailors, including Ma Huan, to Mecca and Medina aboard a native (Indian?) ship going to Jeddah.

Grave
In June 2010, the Chief of Archaeology Department at Nanjing Museum Wang Zhigao announced that a Ming Dynasty grave
recently found near Zutang Mountain (祖堂山) in the Jiangning District of Nanjing was identified as that of Hong Bao (and not of Zheng He himself, as it was earlier surmised).

In literature
In his book 1421: The Year China Discovered the World, amateur historian Gavin Menzies claims Hong Bao made voyages to Antarctica and Australia.

Notes

References
 
 

Chinese explorers
Ming dynasty eunuchs
Chinese admirals
Year of birth uncertain
Year of death uncertain
History of Kerala
Treasure voyages
Explorers of India